Aadhavan Kesavamurthi (Born 1 October 1980), know professionally as Aadhavan, is an Indian artist.  As a mimicry artist, he is well known in comedy circuit for more than a decade. He has been working as RJ (Radio Jockey) and VJ (Video Jockey), in popular Radio and TV channels in Tamil Nadu for a long time. He has made contributions in number of television comedy shows including "Konjam Nadinga Boss", "Super Challenge", "Comedy Junction", "Savaale samaali", "Galatta rani", "Lollu pa", and "Maanga Idiots".  Aadhavan has also acted in movies predominantly in Tamil, and often performs in live orchestras.

Early life
Aadhavan was born in Thanjavur, Tamil Nadu. He did his schooling in Thanjavur, Madurai, Udumalaipettai and Chennai as his father, S Kesavamurthi, who was working as an officer in a bank, was being posted in these places. In 2001, he completed his BE (Electrical and Electronics) in SRM Institute of Science and Technology, Kattankulathur. He was part of a cultural team during his college days. In mimicry, he was inspired by his mother, Dr P Umavathy, who was working as a doctor, used to narrate the way in which her colleagues were spoken at work place.

Radio jockey 
After completing his higher studies in Electrical and Electronics, Aadhavan was, for few years, working in companies related to Banking, and Information Technologies (IT) sectors. A turning point in his professional career came, when Sujith Kumar, HR Head of Infosys and, Founder of Maatram Foundation, invited Aadhavan to perform mimicry during a cultural program at Infosys, Chennai. Shiva, who was working in Radio Mirchi, was the chief guest of that cultural function, where Aadhavan performed mimicry with variety of voices. Impressed by his performance, Shiva invited Aadhavan to join Radio Mirchi as RJ (Radio Jockey). In 2007, Aadhavan, then, started a new career at Radio Mirchi as RJ, and also hosted a show “Kollyudans”, where instant updates, interviews, special shows, and information about newly released movies were given to listeners.

For Radio Mirchi, Aadhavan interviewed number of celebrities including Amitabh Bachchan, Ilaiyaraaja, A. R. Rahman, Kamal Haasan, Bharathiraja, Shyam Benegal, Sathyaraj, Prabhu, Asin, Dhanush, Manobala and Ravichandran Ashwin. Popular playback singers including K. J. Yesudas, Malaysia Vasudevan, S. P. Balasubrahmanyam, Vijay Prakash, Velmurugan, Tippu, Haricharan and  Karthik were also his guests in Radio Mirchi programs.

Video jockey
While Aadhavan was working at Radio Mirchi, he participated as a contestant in "Kalakka Povathu Yaaru" (KPY), Season 4, a Tamil language comedy reality TV show on Vijay TV in 2008. With his ability to mimic voices of celebrities and sense of humor, Aadhavan was adjudged as the title winner of "Kalakka Povathu Yaaru" Season 4. Participation in "Kalakka Povathu Yaaru" gave him an opportunity to show his skills. Aadhavan's talent was noticed by a leading Tamil channel Adithya TV. When Adithya TV, a 24-hour Tamil comedy channel of Sun TV Network was launched on February 8, 2009, Aadhavan was invited to join and host comedy program. He, then, joined Aditya TV on February 15, 2009, and remained in the Sun TV Network for more than a decade.  Aadhavan hosted a comedy show called "Konjam Nadinga Boss" in Adithya TV. This show is the first one of its kind in which random strangers were asked to repeat famous movie dialogues with similar tone as the actor in the movie, and turns it into a comedy. This show made Aadhavan popular.

Aadhavan was chosen to be one of the Judges sharing the space with Madurai Muthu for Comedy Junction, which is a Tamil-language comedy talk show broadcast on Sun TV. He presented a number of live shows including “Vaanga sirikalaam” and  “Idhudhaanda Sirippu”. Aadhavan has also anchored some of the super hit shows namely “Natchathiram”,  “Super Challenge” and “Savaale samaali” (Sun TV), "Galatta Rani" (Kalaignar TV) and “Sun Kudumba Virudhugal 2019.”
Aadhavan was one of the Judges of "Kalakka Povadhu Yaaru" Season 9 on Vijay TV, which marked his return to Vijay TV after a gap of 11 years.

Film career
His association with celebrities, along with his mimicry skills, have helped Aadhavan to make an entry into Tamil film industry as an Actor and an assistant director. Aadhavan lent his voice to Raghuvaran, after his demise, for the 2008 Tamil film  Ellam Avan Seyal . He also lent voice for a golden retriever in the movie Enga Kattula Mazhai (2018). In the beginning, Aadhavan started his career as an assistant director with Dharani, one of the directors in Tamil movies.

Filmography

Actor

Assistant director

References

External links
 Interaction with Aadhavan

Living people
1980 births
Indian radio personalities
Indian VJs (media personalities)
Indian male film actors
Tamil male actors
Male actors in Tamil cinema
Male actors from Tamil Nadu
20th-century Indian male actors
21st-century Indian male actors
Indian impressionists (entertainers)